Tahir Hemphill (born May 14, 1972) is an American multimedia artist, ethnolinguist, and design researcher. He developed the Hip Hop Word Count database.

Early life 
Hemphill grew up in New York City, in the Lower East Side neighborhood. He graduated from Brooklyn Technical High School with a Regents diploma concentration in Electrical Engineering. He is African-American.

Hemphill graduated from Morehouse College with a B.A. in Spanish. He has a certificate in Strategic Planning from Miami Ad School. He has a master's degree in Communications Design which he received from Pratt Institute.

Career

Hip-Hop Word Count database 
Hemphill created an ethnographic database of hip-hop lyrics covering the period from 1979 to the present. In the database, assets are geotagged and dated according to album release dates. Hemphill calls this data a geography of language in the universe of hip-hop. Hemphill faceted the information with analysis of word count, number of syllables per word, number of letters per word, polysyllabic words, as well as an education and audience reading level rating. Hemphill used Simplified Measure of Gobbledygook ("SMOG") and Flesch–Kincaid readability tests (created by plain English advocate Rudolf Flesch) to evaluate reading levels. Within his analysis of Hip-Hop through a scientific lens, he aims to trace origins of certain slang words, how they move to different communities, and their malleable, fluid meanings in different contexts.

Fellowships, grants, etc. 
 2010-2011: Artist-in-Residence, Eyebeam
 2012: Grantee, Creative Capital
 2012-2013: Fellow, WEB Du Bois Institute at Harvard University
 2013: Fellow, The Frank-Ratchye STUDIO for Creative Inquiry at Carnegie Mellon University
 2015: AIM Program participant, Bronx Museum of the Arts

Exhibitions 
 1999: "Black New York Photographers of the Twentieth Century." Schomburg Center for Research in Black Culture
 2002: "Queens International Biennial." Queens Museum of Art
 2002: SIGGRAPH
 2011: "Talk to Me." Museum of Modern Art. July 24, 2011 - November 7, 2011
 2012: "The Box That Rocks: 30 Years of Video Music Box and the Rise of Hip Hop Music & Culture." Museum of Contemporary African Diasporan Arts. March 10 - May 28, 2012

Works and publications 
 Hemphill, Tahir. Visual Alchemy: Subversive Graphic Design in the Urban Environment. Master's Thesis. New York, NY: Pratt Institute: December 1999.

References

External links 
 Tahir Hemphill
 Staple Crops
 

American multimedia artists
African-American artists
1972 births
Living people
21st-century African-American people
20th-century African-American people